Pasteur Street, named after Louis Pasteur, is an important street in Tehran, Iran in which key government institutions are located.
It is highly secured because of the presence of key institutions such as the office of the Iranian President, the center of Iran’s Revolutionary Guards Intelligence leadership, the center of the Assembly of Experts for the Leadership, and the Supreme National Security Council. Also Several military schools, the center of the Armed Forces Logistics and Center for Strategic Studies are located in the street.

See also
 Niavaran Complex

References

External links
Pictures of Tehran

Streets in Tehran
Diplomatic districts